Mona N. Fortier  is a Canadian politician who has served as the president of the Treasury Board since October 26, 2021. A member of the Liberal Party, Fortier has represented the electoral district of Ottawa—Vanier since winning the 3 April 2017 by-election. She previously served as the associate minister of finance and minister of middle class prosperity. Prior to her election, Fortier worked as director of communications for La Cité Collégiale in Ottawa.

Electoral record

References

External links
 Official Website
 Bio & mandate from the Prime Minister
 

Living people
Women members of the House of Commons of Canada
Franco-Ontarian people
Liberal Party of Canada MPs
Members of the House of Commons of Canada from Ontario
Women government ministers of Canada
Members of the 29th Canadian Ministry
Members of the King's Privy Council for Canada
Women in Ontario politics
21st-century Canadian politicians
21st-century Canadian women politicians
Politicians from Ottawa
University of Ottawa alumni
Year of birth missing (living people)